A list of  narrow-gauge railways in Australia.

Installations

See also
 2 ft and 600 mm gauge railways
Heritage railway
Narrow-gauge railways in Australia
Railways on the West Coast of Tasmania

References

External links
Queensland sugar cane railways today

 
Narrow gauge railways in Australia